Sphaerotheriidae is a family of giant pill millipedes of the class Diplopoda. Millipedes of this family are distributed in southern Africa.

Selected genera
Sphaerotherium Brandt, 1833, 54 species, South Africa, Zimbabwe
Kylindotherium Attems, 1926, monotypic, South Africa

References

Sphaerotheriida
Millipedes of Africa
Millipede families